Përikli Dhales (born 1947) is an Albanian footballer. He played in five matches for the Albania national football team from 1963 to 1965.

References

External links
 

1947 births
Living people
Albanian footballers
Albania international footballers
Place of birth missing (living people)
Association football defenders
KF Tirana players